Amrita Vidyalayam is a chain of private CBSE schools run and managed by the Mata Amritanandamayi Math founded by Mata Amritanandamayi. There are more than 90 English medium, co-educational, Senior Secondary schools affiliated to Central Board of Secondary Education throughout India out of which more than 30 are in Kerala. It is one of the leading schools with 90 per cent pass in All India Secondary School Examination and All India Senior School Certificate Examination in consecutive years. They emphasize on value-based education, sports, extra curricular activities and excellence in competitive exams. It provides coaching for NEET-UG, JEE Main, CUET, Olympiads and other competitive exams with the help of its online learning platform Amrita Edge.

History 
The school was founded in 1987 by humanitarian leader Mata Amritanandamayi as a primary English medium school at Kodungallur, Kerala. Later It has improved and now it is a unit of more than 90 schools spread across India.

The school also provides scholarships for students from economically poor families.

The school has got excellenct result in Central Board of Secondary Education Board Examinations in consecutive years.

See also 

 Amrita Vishwa Vidyapeetham
 Mata Amritanandamayi
 Mata Amritanandamayi Math
 Amritapuri
 Kendriya Vidyalaya

External links 

 Amrita Vidyalayam group of schools

References 

Schools in India
Schools in Tamil Nadu
Schools in Karnataka
Non-profit organisations based in India
Central Board of Secondary Education
Educational organisations based in India
High schools and secondary schools in Kerala
Schools affiliated to CBSE
Schools in Delhi
Private schools in Delhi
High schools and secondary schools in Uttar Pradesh
High schools and secondary schools in Tamil Nadu
Schools in Hyderabad, India
Schools in Kerala
High schools and secondary schools in Karnataka
Mata Amritanandamayi Math